Paul Stevens (January 17, 1921 – June 4, 1986) was an American film and television actor.

Stevens played Colonel Charles R. Codman in the 1970 film Patton. He also appeared in Exodus, as a key congressional witness in Advise and Consent and in Marlowe.  

Stevens's television debut occurred on Playhouse 90. He portrayed Paul on the serial The Nurses. He appeared on the serial The Young and the Restless in 1975 (as Bruce Henderson) and on the soap opera Another World from 1977 to 1985 (as Brian Bancroft). Stevens also played Mendez, one of the leaders of the mutant underground, in Battle for the Planet of the Apes. Stevens was nominated for a Daytime Emmy Award as Outstanding Supporting Actor in a Drama Series for his role on Another World.  

Stevens was a guest star on many television series from 1954 until 1977, including The Man from U.N.C.L.E., The Wild Wild West ("The Night of the Samurai"), The Rockford Files (as two different characters in two episodes), The Streets of San Francisco, Baretta, Ironside, Police Story, Gunsmoke, Mannix, Mission: Impossible, Hawaii Five-0, and McMillan and Wife.

On Broadway, Stevens appeared in The Advocate (1963), Andorra (1963), General Seeger (1962), Compulsion (1957), and The Merchant of Venice (1953).

On June 4, 1986, Stevens died of pneumonia at Bellevue Hospital, aged 65.

Filmography

References

External links

1921 births
1986 deaths
Male actors from Los Angeles
20th-century American male actors
American male television actors
American male film actors
American male soap opera actors
Deaths from pneumonia in New York City